Signal-regulatory protein gamma is a protein that in humans is encoded by the SIRPG gene. SIRPG has also recently been designated CD172G (cluster of differentiation 172G).

The protein encoded by this gene is a member of the signal-regulatory protein (SIRP) family, and also belongs to the immunoglobulin superfamily. SIRP family members are receptor-type transmembrane glycoproteins known to be involved in the negative regulation of receptor tyrosine kinase-coupled signaling processes. Alternatively spliced transcript variants encoding different isoforms have been described.

References

Further reading

External links 
 PDBe-KB provides an overview of all the structure information available in the PDB for Human Signal-regulatory protein gamma (SIRPG)

Clusters of differentiation